ONIX for Books is an XML format for sharing bibliographic data pertaining to both traditional books and eBooks. It is the oldest of the three ONIX standards, and is widely implemented in the book trade in North America, Europe and increasingly in the Asia-Pacific region. It allows book and ebook publishers to create and manage a corpus of rich metadata about their products, and to exchange it with their customers (distributors and retailers) in a coherent, unambiguous, and largely automated manner.

Overview
The ONIX for Books standard provides a free-to-use format for passing descriptive metadata about books between publishers, data aggregators, book retailers and other interested parties in the publishing industry. Metadata concerning one or more book titles can be stored in a suitably formatted XML file known as an 'ONIX message' ready for dissemination. Whereas other data standards exist for storing the contents of a book - the text, layout and graphics - the ONIX for Books standard holds information about the book, similar to, but more extensive than, the information one would typically find on the cover or title page of a printed book or in a library catalog. The ONIX for Books standard provides a way to communicate information about a book's author, publisher, price, publication date, physical dimensions, synopsis and many other details besides. The standard is quite extensive and most publishers currently provide only a few dozen of the many hundreds of pieces of information that the standard is designed to carry.

Versioning
ONIX for Books Release 1.0 was published in 2000. Revisions were made in releases 1.1, 1.2 and 1.2.1.

Release 2.0 was issued in 2001. A backwards-compatible version, Release 2.1, arrived in June 2003. Three minor revisions intended for general use have been made since then, the most recent in January 2006. A further revision intended solely for use in Japan was issued in 2010.

Release 3.0 was published in April 2009 with some corrections in 2010, and the first minor revision (labelled 3.0.1) was issued in January 2012. A second minor revision (3.0.2) was published in January 2014 and a third in April 2016. The latest version is 3.0.7, released in October 2019, and the standard continues to evolve to meet new business requirements as they emerge. This 3.0 release has not yet completely replaced 2.1, though implementation of 3.0 is widespread and continuing to grow. There is also an Acknowledgement message format (published 2015) which recipients of ONIX data files may send to confirm receipt of ONIX messages.

The authors have stated that any new revisions will be based on, and backwards-compatible with, Release 3.0. The international steering committee announced in January 2012 that support for version 2.1 would be reduced at the end of December 2014.

Releases 2.1 and 3.0 share a set of 'Codelists' or controlled vocabularies, that are extended regularly to allow new types of information to be carried without having to revise the main specifications. From Issue 37 of the controlled vocabularies, additions are applicable only to ONIX 3.0, and ONIX 2.1 is limited to Issue 36 or earlier.

Usage
The ONIX for Books standard can be used to communicate a great deal more information than most publishers currently choose to provide. There are a number of reasons for this. Firstly, the standard is designed for use with many different types of book and no single publication is expected to use all of them. The standard also provides for the inclusion of sales and pricing information which a publisher may not wish to freely distribute outside their organization. And while the ONIX for Books standard has been around since 2000, many publishers are still getting to grips with producing ONIX messages; the task is made easier if the amount of information provided for each title is kept to a minimum. However, studies have found that a richer selection of metadata is associated with enhanced sales of books and eBooks.

See also
MARC standards
BIBFRAME

References

Sources
 EDItEUR – ONIX for Books overview
 BISG – Metadata committee, ONIX for Books

Markup languages
Industry-specific XML-based standards
Bibliography file formats